The Colonial Athletic Association men's soccer tournament is the annual conference championship tournament for the Colonial Athletic Association (CAA). The tournament has been held every year since 1983, when the CAA began sponsoring a men's soccer program.

Format 
Presently, the Colonial Athletic Association Men's Soccer Tournaments features six conference teams that have the best conference regular season record. The regular season champion and runner-up receive byes to the semifinal round. The third through six-placed teams play in a play-in round at the site of the higher seed. The winners take on the top two seeds, which is hosted at the site of the team that wins the regular season. The champion earns an automatic berth into the NCAA Division I Men's Soccer Championship.

Tournament champions

CAA Teams performance in the NCAA Tournament 
Key
 F = Finals
 SF = College Cup
 QF = Quarterfinals
 R4 = Fourth round
 R3 = Third round
 R2 = Second round
 R1 = First round

Titles by school 
Teams in italics no longer play in the CAA.

See also 
 Colonial Athletic Association

References

External links
 

 
NCAA Division I men's soccer conference tournaments